The Fiesselmann thiophene synthesis is a name reaction in organic chemistry that allows for the generation of 3-hydroxy-2-thiophenecarboxylic acid derivatives from α,β-acetylenic esters with thioglycolic acid and its derivatives under the presence of a base. The reaction was developed by Hans Fiesselmann in the 1950s.

Mechanism 

After deprotonation the thioglycolic acid ester attacks the tripel bond of the alkyne. Another addition takes place on the resulting double bond. Via deprotonation of a thioglycolic acid ester moiety the cyclization is initialized. From the resulting thiolane an alcoholate is eliminated to yield a ketone. Elimination of a thioglycolic acid ester results in an α,β-unsaturated ketone. Tautomerization leads to the desired product.

Applications 

A variation of the Fiesselmann synthesis by Lissavetzky starts from a cyclic β-ketoester and thioglycolic acid. In combination with an alcohol (R4OH) the monoadduct is the main product. Without the addition of alcohol a thioacetal is generated. In presence of potassium hydroxide it can be esterificated and cyclisized. To cyclisize the mono adduct a sodium alcoholate is used.

If the substrate contains a nitrile instead of an ester group the reaction will result in 3-aminothiophenes. Scott used this approach to synthesis a p38 kinase inhibitor.

The reaction also works with aromatic derivates. Fry used this variation for the synthesis of tyrosinkinase inhibitors, starting from a substituted pyridine.

Nicolaou used the conditions of the Fiesselmann thiophene synthesis to show potential DNA cleaving properties of golfomycin A, a cyclic alkyne with potential antitumor activity. The Fiesselmann synthesis is also used to produce potential antiallergy agents, antileishmanial and antifungal agents and thieno[b]azepinediones.

References

Name reactions
Sulfur heterocycle forming reactions